Millenium is a progressive rock group formed in Poland in 1999, led by Ryszard Kramarski.

Line-up

Current members 
 Dawid Lewandowski - vocals
 Piotr Płonka - guitar
 Krzysztof Wyrwa - bass guitar, Chapman Stick
 Ryszard Kramarski - keyboards, guitar
 Grzegorz Bauer - drums, percussion

Former members 
 Piotr Mazurkiewicz - bass guitar
 Tomasz Pabian - guitar
 Przemysław Drużkowski - guitar
 Marcin Błaszak
 Łukasz Gałęziowski "Gall" - vocals
 Tomasz Paśko - percussion

Discography 
Based on the official group website.
Millenium has released 23 albums, live concert recordings and compilations included.

Albums 
 1999 - Millenium
 2000 - Vocanda
 2002 - Reincarnations
 2004 - Deja Vu
 2005 - Interdead
 2006 - Numbers and Big Dreams of Mr Sunders
 2007 - 7 Years: Novelties, rarities ... & the best (2CD)
 2008 - Three Brothers' Epilogue (EP)
 2008 - Exist
 2010 - Back After Years Live in Krakow 2009 (2CD & DVD; live album)
 2011 - Puzzles
 2011 - White Crow (compilation)
 2013 - Ego
 2013 - Vocanda 2013 Live in Studio 
 2014 - In Search of the Perfect Melody
 2017 - 44 Minutes
 2018 - MMXVIII
 2019 - The Web
 2020 - Forgotten Songs (RSD 2020 Release - vinyl only)
 2020 - Rarities  (Compilation)
 2020 - The Sin
 2022 - Tales From Imaginary Movies
 2022 - Something Ends, Something Begins (The best of... 2CD)

Singles 
 1999 - Ekopieśń
 1999 - Był Sobie Kraj
 2000 - Lady Cash Casch
 2002 - Cygara Smak
 2004 - The Silent Hill
 2005 - Demon
 2006 - Numbers...
 2007 - 7 years

References

External links 

 Official website

Polish progressive rock groups